A cold front is the leading edge of a cooler mass of air at ground level that replaces a warmer mass of air and lies within a pronounced surface trough of low pressure. It often forms behind an extratropical cyclone (to the west in the Northern Hemisphere, to the east in the Southern), at the leading edge of its cold air advection pattern—known as the cyclone's dry "conveyor belt" flow. Temperature differences across the boundary can exceed  from one side to the other. When enough moisture is present, rain can occur along the boundary. If there is significant instability along the boundary, a narrow line of thunderstorms can form along the frontal zone. If instability is weak, a broad shield of rain can move in behind the front, and evaporative cooling of the rain can increase the temperature difference across the front. Cold fronts are stronger in the fall and spring transition seasons and are weakest during the summer.

Development of cold fronts

A cold front occurs when a mass of comparatively colder air moves into where warmer air is present. The drier, colder air forms a steeply sloping boundary under the warmer, moister air at the surface and lifts that air. This often causes cloud formations with a strong vertical development, which may manifest as a line of showers and thunderstorms when enough moisture is present. On weather maps, the surface position of the cold front is marked with the symbol of a blue line of triangles/spikes (pips) pointing in the direction of travel. A cold front's location is at the leading edge of the temperature drop off, which in an isotherm analysis would show up as the leading edge of the isotherm gradient, and it normally lies within a sharp surface trough. Cold fronts move faster than warm fronts and can produce sharper changes in weather. Since cold air is denser than warm air, it rapidly replaces the warm air preceding the boundary.

In the northern hemisphere, a cold front usually causes a shift of wind from southwest to northwest clockwise, also known as veering, and in the southern hemisphere a shift from northwest to southwest (counterclockwise, backing). Atmospheric pressure steadily decreases with the approach of a cold front. With frontal passage, the pressure rises sharply and then stabilizes. Normally, cold fronts can be marked by these characteristics:

*provided there is sufficient moisture.

Clouds

If the cold front is highly unstable, cumulonimbus clouds producing thunderstorms commonly form along the front. Anvil cirrus clouds may spread a considerable distance downwind from the thunderstorms. The other cloud types associated with a cold front depend on atmospheric conditions such as air mass stability and wind shear.  As the front approaches, middle-étage gives way to altostratus and low-level stratocumulus with intermittent light precipitation if the warm airmass being displaced by the cold front is mostly stable. With significant airmass instability, vertically developed cumulus or cumulonimbus with showers and thunderstorms will form along the front.

After the passage of the cold front, the sky usually clears as high pressure builds in behind the system, although significant amounts of cumulus or stratocumulus, often in the form of long bands called cloud streets may persist if the air mass behind the front remains humid from a source of moisture. Small and unchanging amounts of cumulus or cirrus clouds in an otherwise clear sky are usually indications of continuing fair weather as long as the barometric pressure remains comparatively high.

Precipitation

A cold front commonly brings a narrow band of precipitation that follows along the leading edge of the cold front. These bands of precipitation are often very strong, and can bring severe thunderstorms, hailstorms, snow squalls, and/or tornadoes. In the spring, these cold fronts can be very strong, and can bring strong winds when the pressure gradient is higher than normal. During the winter months, cold fronts sometimes come through an area with little or no precipitation.  Wider rain bands can occur behind cold fronts which tend to have more stratiform, and less convective, precipitation.  These rainstorms sometimes bring flooding, and can move very slowly when the storm steering it is strong and embedded within a meridional flow pattern (with more pole to equator motion rather than west to east motion). In the winter, cold fronts can bring cold spells, and occasionally snow. In the spring or summer in temperate latitudes, hail may occasionally fall along with the rain.  If moisture is not sufficient, such as when a system has previously moved across a mountain barrier, cold fronts can pass without cloudiness.

Frontogenetical circulation
Frontogenesis is the process of creating or steepening the temperature gradient of a front. During this process the atmosphere reacts in an attempt to restore balance, the consequence is a circular motion along the front where air is being lifted up, along the cold front and dropping downward, behind the frontal boundary. This is the actual force of upward motion along a front that is responsible for clouds and precipitation.

As the temperature gradient steepens during frontogenesis, the thermal wind becomes imbalanced. To maintain balance, the geostrophic wind aloft and below adjust, such that regions of divergence/convergence form. Mass continuity would require a vertical transport of air along the cold front where there is divergence (lowered pressure). Although this circulation is described by a series of processes, they are actually occurring at the same time, observable along the front as a thermally direct circulation. There are several factors that influence the final shape and tilt of the circulation around the front, ultimately determining the kind and location of clouds and precipitation.

Temperature changes
Cold fronts are the leading edge of cooler air masses, hence the name "cold front". They have stronger temperature changes during the fall (autumn) and spring and during the middle of winter. When cold fronts come through, there is usually a quick, yet strong gust of wind, that shows that the cold front is passing. In surface weather observations, a remark known as FROPA is coded when this occurs. The effects from a cold front can last from hours to days. The air behind the front is cooler than the air it is replacing and the warm air is forced to rise, so it cools. As the cooler air cannot hold as much moisture as warm air, clouds form and rain occurs.

Characteristics of boundaries around an extratropical cyclone

Cold fronts form when a cooler air mass moves into an area of warmer air in the wake of a developing extratropical cyclone. The warmer air interacts with the cooler air mass along the boundary, and usually produces precipitation.  Cold fronts often follow a warm front or squall line. Very commonly, cold fronts have a warm front ahead but with a perpendicular orientation.  In areas where cold fronts catch up to the warm front, the occluded front develops.  Occluded fronts have an area of warm air aloft.  When such a feature forms poleward of an extratropical cyclone, it is known as a trowal, which is short for TRough Of Warm Air aLoft.  A cold front is re-designated a warm front if it begins to retreat ahead of the next extratropical cyclone along the frontal boundary, and called a stationary front if it stalls.  An especially sharp type of cold front, easily discernable in satellite images, is the Narrow Cold Frontal Rainband.

See also
 Air mass
 Blue Norther (weather)
 Cold wave
 Surface weather analysis
 Weather front

References

External links
 Cold Front: transition zone from warm air to cold air
 Weather Fronts
 Fronts: the boundaries between air masses

Weather fronts
Cold